The Rand West City Local Municipality council consists of 69 members elected by mixed-member proportional representation. 35 councillors are elected by first-past-the-post voting in 35 wards, while the remaining 34 are chosen from party lists so that the total number of party representatives is proportional to the number of votes received.

It was established for the August 2016 local elections by the merging of Randfontein and Westonaria local municipalities. It is a division of the West Rand District Municipality.

In the election of 1 November 2021 the African National Congress (ANC) lost their majority of  seats on the council.

Results 
The following table shows the composition of the council after past elections.

August 2016 election

The following table shows the results of the 2016 election.

November 2021 election

The following table shows the results of the 2021 election.

By-elections from November 2021
The following by-elections were held to fill vacant ward seats in the period from the election in November 2021.

References

Rand West City
elections